Auratonota oxytenia is a species of moth of the family Tortricidae. It is found in Mexico.

The wingspan is about 16 mm. The ground colour of the forewings is pale brownish, represented fasciae. The colour is glossy white along the edges of the markings. These markings are brownish. The hindwings are brownish.

References

Moths described in 2000
Auratonota
Moths of Central America